Puxico is the debut studio album by American singer and songwriter Natalie Hemby, released on January 13, 2017, through her own label, GetWrucke Productions. Hemby started recording the album around the same time she created a documentary about her hometown Puxico in 2010.

Singles 
Return was released as the lead single from Puxico on October 21, 2016.

Critical reception 

Will Hermes from Rolling Stone stated about the album "It's a nostalgic LP, musically and thematically, about the value of roots – surprising, maybe, from a woman behind songs like Lambert's 'Pink Sunglasses' and 'Getaway Driver', which broaden country's palette. But Hemby's a master craftswoman, and in an era of rule-by-Twitter, songs like 'Grand Restoration' and 'Time Honored Tradition' make a case for traditionalism being its own kind of progressivism."

Accolades

Track listing

Charts

References 

Natalie Hemby albums
2017 albums